The Church of St. Pankratius is a parish church of the Roman Catholic parish of Schwalbach am Taunus, Hesse, Germany. It is also used as a concert venue.

The church was built from 1753 to 1756, and was dedicated to St. Pancras of Rome. In 2007 the parishes of St. Pankratius in Alt-Schwalbach and of St. Martin in Limesstadt were merged, but both churches main in use for worship.

References

External links 
 

Roman Catholic churches in Hesse
Baroque architecture in Hesse
Roman Catholic churches completed in 1756
Buildings and structures in Main-Taunus-Kreis
18th-century Roman Catholic church buildings in Germany